Thomas Karl Johan Enqvist (born 13 March 1974) is a Swedish former professional tennis player. He reached the final of the 1999 Australian Open and won a total of 19 singles titles, including three Masters titles. He has a career high ATP world singles ranking of No. 4, achieved on 15 November 1999.

Tennis career

Throughout his career, Enqvist finished four seasons ranked inside the top 10 and won at least one ATP title for six consecutive years. In 1998 he underwent surgery in Stockholm to remove a small piece of bone from his right foot and had surgery on his right shoulder to repair a repetitive strain injury. Despite his surgeries, Enqvist posted some major victories, including wins over world no. 1 Pete Sampras, Juan Carlos Ferrero, and Andy Roddick.

Enqvist won a total of 19 singles titles, the most significant being ATP Masters Series titles at Paris (1996), Stuttgart (1999) and both the singles and doubles titles in Cincinnati (2000). In winning the Stuttgart Masters, he defeated four top 10 players, including world no. 1 Andre Agassi.

His best showing at a Grand Slam event was at the 1999 Australian Open, when he beat Jan-Michael Gambill, Byron Black, Pat Rafter, Mark Philippoussis, Marc Rosset and Nicolás Lapentti before losing in the final to Yevgeny Kafelnikov of Russia. He also reached the quarterfinals at the 1996 Australian Open and at Wimbledon in 2001.

Enqvist was a force on the Swedish Davis Cup team. In 1998, he helped Sweden reach the finals of the Davis Cup for the fourth time in five years.

From 2017 to 2019, Enqvist was captain of the Swedish Davis Cup team. He currently works as a commentator for Eurosport Sweden. Enqvist is also the current vice-captain for Team Europe in the Laver Cup, a position he has held since the inaugural tournament. 

He has been provisionally coaching Stefanos Tsitsipas since February 2022, starting with the Rotterdam Open.

Significant finals

Grand Slam finals

Singles: 1 (0–1)

Masters Series finals

Singles: 4 (3–1)

Career singles finals

Singles: 26 (19–7)

Doubles: 1 (1–0)

Singles performance timeline

Top 10 wins

References

External links
 
 
 
 Thomas Enqvist fan site

1974 births
Living people
Australian Open (tennis) junior champions
French Open junior champions
Olympic tennis players of Sweden
People from Monte Carlo
Tennis players from Stockholm
Swedish expatriates in Monaco
Swedish male tennis players
Tennis players at the 1996 Summer Olympics
Tennis players at the 2004 Summer Olympics
Wimbledon junior champions
Grand Slam (tennis) champions in boys' singles
Grand Slam (tennis) champions in boys' doubles
Masters tennis players